Warren John Ewens  (born 23 January 1937 in Canberra) is an Australian-born mathematician who has been Professor of Biology at the University of Pennsylvania since 1997. (He also held that position 1972–1977.) He concentrates his research on the mathematical, statistical and theoretical aspects of population genetics. Ewens has worked in mathematical population genetics, computational biology, and evolutionary population genetics. He introduced Ewens's sampling formula.

Ewens received a B.A. (1958) and M.A. (1960) in Mathematical Statistics from the University of Melbourne, where he was a resident student at Trinity College, and a Ph.D. from the Australian National University (1963) under P. A. P. Moran. He first joined the department of biology at the University of Pennsylvania in 1972, and in 2006 was named the Christopher H. Browne Distinguished Professor of Biology. Positions held include:
1967–1972 Foundation Chair and Professor of Mathematics at La Trobe University
1972–1977 Professor of Biology at the University of Pennsylvania 
1978–1996 Chair and Professor of Mathematics at Monash University 
1997– Professor of Biology at the University of Pennsylvania

Prof. Ewens is a Fellow of the Royal Society and the Australian Academy of Science.  He is also the recipient of the Australian Statistical Society's E.J. Pitman Medal (1996), and Oxford University's Weldon Memorial Prize. His teaching and mentoring at the University of Pennsylvania have also been recognized by awards.

Prof. Ewens also participates in the Genomics and Computational Biology (GCB) Ph.D. program of the University of Pennsylvania School of Medicine.

Since 2006, he has taught statistics at the University of Pennsylvania's Wharton School.

In 2022, Ewens was appointed Officer of the Order of Australia in the 2022 Queen's Birthday Honours for "distinguished service to biology and data science, to research, and to tertiary education".

Publications
Ewen has produced many publications; the following is a small selection:

'Statistical Methods in Bioinformatics: An Introduction (Statistics for Biology and Health)'
'Kingman and mathematical population genetics' in 'Probability and mathematical genetics' edited by N.H. Bingham and C.M. Goldie 
'Genetics and Analysis of Quantitative Traits', American Journal of Human Biology 1999
'On estimating P values by Monte Carlo methods' American Journal of Human Genetics 2003
'Sam Karlin and the stochastic theory of evolutionary population genetics' Theoretical Population Biology 2009

See also
 Ewens's sampling formula (the multivariate Ewens distribution)

References

External links
 
Ewens, Warren John (1937 – ), Encyclopedia of Australian Science 2010
Ewens, W. J. (Warren John) at trove.nla.gov.au 
'Pitman Medal Awarded to W. J. Ewens', Australian Journal of Statistics, vol. 39, no. 1, 1997, pp. 1–4. 
Ewens' page at the University of Pennsylvania
Warren Ewens named Christopher H. Browne Distinguished Professor of Biology

1937 births
People from Canberra
Living people
People educated at Trinity College (University of Melbourne)
University of Pennsylvania faculty
University of Pennsylvania Department of Biology faculty
Mathematicians at the University of Pennsylvania
Australian mathematicians
Fellows of the Royal Society
Officers of the Order of Australia
Population geneticists
Fellows of the Australian Academy of Science